Tropical EC-60043 was an electric-powered 4-seat "city car" produced by Tropical, a Greek company specializing in the development of electric and hydrogen-powered vehicles and machinery. The EC-60043, essentially an assembled version of a U.S. model, had a 5.2 hp (4 kW @ 48V) electric engine, maximum speed 45 km/h and maximum range 90 km. As of 2018, the vehicles are no longer being sold.

External links 
Company website

Cars of Greece
Electric city cars